The Asia/Oceania Zone is one of three zones of regional competition in the 2019 Fed Cup.

Group I 
 Venue: Daulet National Tennis Centre, Astana, Kazakhstan (indoor hard)
 Date: 6–9 February

The seven teams were divided into one pool of 3 teams (Pool A) and one pool of 4 teams (Pool B). The two pool winners took part in a play-off to determine the nation advancing to the World Group II play-offs. The teams that finished third in each pool took part in a play-off to determine which nation will be relegated to Asia/Oceania Zone Group II in 2020. The nation finishing fourth in Pool B was automatically relegated.

Seeding

 1Fed Cup Rankings as of 12 November 2018

Pools

Play-offs

Final placements 

  was promoted to the 2019 Fed Cup World Group II play-offs.

Group II 
 Venue 1: Pamir Stadium, Dushanbe, Tajikistan (hard) 
 Dates: 12–15 June 

 Venue 2: National Tennis Centre, Kuala Lumpur, Malaysia (hard)
 Dates: 19–23 June

13 nations will compete across two different venues. In Dushanbe, six teams will compete across two pools of 3 teams (Pools A & B). The winners of each pool will play-off to determine which nation will advance to Asia/Oceania Zone Group I. In Kuala Lumpur, seven teams will compete across two pools of 3 and 4 teams (Pools A & B). The winners of each pool will play-off to determine which nation will advance to Asia/Oceania Zone Group I. One team will be promoted from each venue.

Seeding

 1Fed Cup Rankings as of 22 April 2019

Pools

Play-offs

Final placements 

References

External links 
 Fed Cup website
 Fed Cup Result, 2019 Asia/Oceania Group I
 Fed Cup Result, 2019 Asia/Oceania Group II

 
Asia/Oceania
Tennis tournaments in Kazakhstan
Tennis tournaments in Tajikistan
Tennis tournaments in Malaysia
Fed Cup Asia/Oceania Zone
Fed Cup Asia/Oceania Zone
2019 in Malaysian tennis